Elizabeth Fong Sung (14 October 1954 – 22 May 2018) was a Chinese-American actress, director, and screenwriter. She was also a revered acting teacher and mentor to young performers and filmmakers in the Asian-Pacific community.

Early life and education
Sung was born and raised in British Hong Kong and studied ballet at a young age before coming to the United States.

She attended the Juilliard School and earned a BFA in dance. She was a member of the Alvin Ailey Dance Company. Sung also earned an MFA in directing from the American Film Institute.

Career
From 1994-96, Sung appeared on the American soap opera The Young and the Restless as Luan Volien. She directed the short film Requiem, which was based on her childhood in Hong Kong and her journey to New York City as a ballet student. It won a CINE Golden Eagle Award in 1996.

Her other notable television appearances included roles on Hawaii Five-O, The Sopranos, Bones, Curb Your Enthusiasm, NCIS: Los Angeles, and Charmed. She starred in The Joy Luck Club, Memoirs of a Geisha, and Lethal Weapon 4.

Sung appeared in the Asian-American comedies including Anita Ho, Front Cover, and Vivian Bang's White Rabbit that screened at the Sundance Festival in 2018.

Personal life and death
Sung was married to writer and actor Peter Tulipan. She was fluent in both Cantonese and Mandarin. Her brother, Philip, died in 1985 from AIDS.

Sung died on 22 May 2018, aged 63. Her cause of death initially had not been released, but it was later revealed Sung died from lymphoma.

Filmography

Film

Television

Video games

References

Citations

Sources

External links

Elizabeth Sung at ECI Global Talent Management

1954 births
2018 deaths
American people of Chinese descent
American film directors of Hong Kong descent
American theatre directors of Chinese descent
American film directors
American women film directors
AFI Conservatory alumni
American film actresses
American television actresses
American video game actresses
American voice actresses
20th-century American actresses
21st-century American actresses
Hong Kong emigrants to the United States
Deaths from lymphoma
Juilliard School alumni